The Guardians of Scotland were regents who governed the Kingdom of Scotland from 1286 until 1292 and from 1296 until 1306. During the many years of minority in Scotland's subsequent history, there were many guardians of Scotland and the post was a significant constitutional feature in the course of development for politics in the country.

Guardians of Scotland during the First Interregnum 1286–1292
The First Interregnum began upon the death of Alexander III of Scotland in 1286. Alexander's only surviving descendant was Margaret, Maid of Norway, who was a young child and living in Norway where her father Eric II was king. She was finally sent to Great Britain in 1290, but she died before arriving in Scotland. The next king of Scots was not determined until completion of an arbitration in 1292. 

The following persons served as guardians during the First Interregnum:

 William Fraser, Bishop of St Andrews
 Robert Wishart, Bishop of Glasgow
 John Comyn II of Badenoch
 James Stewart, 5th High Steward of Scotland
 Alexander Comyn, Earl of Buchan
 Donnchadh III, Earl of Fife

In a letter (written in Old French) from the Scots Parliament of 1290, sitting at Birgham, confirming the Treaty of Salisbury, the guardians of Scotland are listed as:
"... Guillaume de Seint Andreu et Robert de Glasgu evesques, Johan Comyn et James Seneschal de Escoce, gardeins du reaume de Escoce..."

English translation: "William [Fraser] of St Andrews and Robert [Wishart] of Glasgow bishops, John Comyn and James the Steward of Scotland, guardians of the kingdom of Scotland".

 Bryan FitzAlan, Lord FitzAlan (13 June 1291 – ????)

Guardians of Scotland during the Second Interregnum 1296–1306

Guardians during the minority and reign of David II
The Guardians during the minority and reign of David II were:
 Sir Thomas Randolph, 1st Earl of Moray (1329–1332), appointed by the Act of Settlement of 1318.
 Donald, Earl of Mar (1332, for ten days)
 Sir Andrew Moray of Bothwell (1332 until captured by the English at Roxburgh Bridge in October).
 Sir Archibald Douglas (1332 until killed at the Battle of Halidon Hill in July 1333)
 Sir Andrew Moray of Bothwell for the second time (1335–1338, when he died following a brief illness)
 Robert the Steward, nephew (older in years) to David and future king of Scotland. Robert was guardian on four occasions, sometimes jointly, and latterly twice during the eleven years of the king's enforced absence as a prisoner in England after the Battle of Neville's Cross (1346–1357). He used these years to build a large power base in the country, especially north of the Forth.

Guardians during the reign of Robert II
Guardians during the infirmity of King Robert II
 John Stewart, Earl of Carrick (November 1384–December 1388)
 Robert Stewart, Earl of Fife (December 1388 – 1390)

See also
Competitors for the crown of Scotland
List of regents in Scotland
History of Scotland
Politics of Scotland

References

Sources
 Mack, James Logan (1926). The Border Line. Pub. Oliver & Boyd. pp. 317–322. 
 McNaught, Duncan (1912). Kilmaurs Parish and Burgh. Pub. A.Gardner. p. 9.

External links
Cast of the seal of the Guardians of Scotland (NAS reference RH17/1/17)  and Saint Andrew seals Scotland's independence; at the National Archives of Scotland
Seal impression (cast), of Guardians of Scotland; at the National Museums of Scotland

 
Wars of Scottish Independence
1290s in Scotland

Lists of Scottish people
1300s in Scotland